The iPhone 14 and iPhone 14 Plus (also stylized as iPhone 14+) are smartphones designed, developed, and marketed by Apple Inc. They are the sixteenth generation of iPhones, succeeding the iPhone 13 and iPhone 13 Mini, and were announced during Apple Event, Apple Park in Cupertino, California, on September 7, 2022, alongside the higher-priced iPhone 14 Pro and iPhone 14 Pro Max flagships. The iPhone 14 was made available on September 16, 2022, and iPhone 14 Plus was made available on October 7, 2022, priced at $799 and $899 respectively and was launched with iOS 16. Pre-orders for the iPhone 14 and iPhone 14 Plus began on September 9, 2022.

The iPhone 14 does not have a "Mini" version like its predecessor, the iPhone 13 Mini. Instead, Apple has reintroduced a larger dimension iPhone 14 named the iPhone 14 Plus. Apple has not introduced a Plus model iPhone since the iPhone 8 Plus in 2017. iPhone 14 and 14 Plus models (as well as iPhone 14 Pro and iPhone 14 Pro Max models) sold in the United States drop support for physical SIM cards, making them the first iPhone models since the CDMA variant of the iPhone 4 to not come with a discrete SIM card reader.

History
The iPhone 14 was originally rumored to come with 6.1-inch and 5.4-inch display size options. However, when the iPhone 14 was unveiled, no smaller display option was available. This may have been due to underwhelming sales of the  iPhone 12 Mini and iPhone 13 Mini.  Instead, a larger 6.7-inch display size option was added on the lower-priced iPhone 14 lineup. The new 6.7-inch variant of the iPhone 14 was named "iPhone 14 Plus", rather than "iPhone 14 Max", which was predicted by previous rumors.

The iPhone 14 and iPhone 14 Plus were officially announced at Apple's "Far Out" event, along with the iPhone 14 Pro, iPhone 14 Pro Max, Apple Watch Series 8, Apple Watch SE (2nd generation), Apple Watch Ultra, AirPods Pro (2nd generation) and an update to Apple Fitness+ via a virtual press conference filmed at Apple Park in Cupertino, California on September 7, 2022.

Pre-orders began on September 9, with general availability from September 16 for the iPhone 14 and October 7 for the iPhone 14 Plus.

Design

The iPhone 14 and iPhone 14 Plus have an identical design to the iPhone 13, although for the US models, the physical SIM tray is removed.

The iPhone 14 and iPhone 14 Plus are available in six colors: Blue, Purple, Midnight, Starlight, Yellow, and Product Red. Purple is a new color replacing Pink used on the iPhone 13 and iPhone 13 Mini. Yellow was added as a new color in March 2023.

Specifications

Hardware
iPhone 14 and 14 Plus are available in three internal storage configurations: 128, 256, and 512 GB. It has 6 GB of RAM, an increase over the iPhone 13 and 13 mini model's 4 GB of RAM. The iPhone 14 and 14 Plus have the same IP68 rating for dust and water resistance as their predecessors.

Chipset
The iPhone 14 and iPhone 14 Plus are equipped with the Apple A15 Bionic system on a chip, the same variant used on the 2021 iPhone 13 Pro and 13 Pro Max. The iPhone 14 and 14 Plus feature a 6-core CPU, 5-core GPU, and 16-core Neural Engine.

Display
The iPhone 14 features a  display with Super Retina XDR OLED technology at a resolution of 2532 × 1170 pixels and a pixel density of about 460 PPI with a refresh rate of 60Hz. The iPhone 14 Plus features a  display with the same technology at a resolution of 2778 × 1284 pixels and a pixel density of about 458 PPI. Both models have typical brightness up to 800 nits, and max brightness up to 1200 nits.

Cameras
The iPhone 14 and 14 Plus feature the same camera system with two cameras: one front-facing camera (12MP f/1.9), and two back-facing cameras: a wide (12MP f/1.5) and ultra-wide (12MP f/2.4) camera, with the wide and front-facing cameras having a faster aperture than the iPhone 13. The front facing camera also has autofocus for the first time.

The cameras use Apple's latest computational photography engine, called Smart HDR 4. Users can also choose from a range of photographic styles during capture, including rich contrast, vibrant, warm, and cool. Apple clarifies this is different from a filter because it works intelligently with the image processing algorithm during capture to apply local adjustments to an image and the effects will be baked into the photos, unlike filters which can be removed after applying.

The camera app contains Cinematic Mode, which allows users to rack focus between subjects and create (simulate) shallow depth of field using software algorithms. It is supported on wide and front-facing cameras in 4K at 30 fps.

Battery
The iPhone 14 is equipped with slightly longer battery life compared to the iPhone 13. According to the manufacturer, the iPhone 14 (3,279 mAh) can provide up to 20 hours of video playback, 16 hours of streaming video playback, and 80 hours of audio playback. The battery life of the iPhone 13 (3,240 mAh), on the other hand, is rated at 19 hours for video playback, 15 hours for streaming video playback, and 75 hours for audio playback. However, the iPhone 14 Plus (4,325 mAh) variant provides 26 hours of video playback.

Software 

The iPhone 14 and 14 Plus originally shipped with iOS 16.

Detailed Specs

Satellite connectivity
Apple's new Emergency SOS via satellite service for iPhone 14 and iPhone 14 Pro models uses the spectrum in L and S bands designated for mobile satellite services by ITU Radio Regulations. When an iPhone user makes an Emergency SOS via satellite request, the message is received by an orbiting satellite operated by Globalstar. The satellite then sends the message down to ground stations located across the globe.

As of November 2022, Globalstar operates a constellation of 24 satellites in low-earth orbit, with plans to enhance this in the future via its partnership with Apple.

The service became available to US and Canada on November 15, 2022, and to the UK, Germany, Ireland, and France on December 13, 2022.

Criticism

Lack of change from the iPhone 13 

A major criticism of the iPhone 14 is that the base model has almost the same specifications of the iPhone 13, including the CPU. Until this iPhone was released, Apple had updated the CPU on both the regular and Pro models. Instead, this iPhone stays on the same chip as the iPhone 13.

Crash Detection false positives 

Crash Detection is a feature built into the iPhone 14 that is designed to detect severe car crashes and automatically initiates an emergency phone call 20 seconds after it is detected unless the user cancels it. Since its release, there have been many reports saying that the feature was automatically turned on during rollercoaster rides, due to the fact that the rides suddenly stop after going at high speeds, acting the same way a car crash does.

Emergency dispatchers have received many false alarm calls from iPhone 14 and Apple Watch users who have been skiing safely. In Colorado, a wave of false 9-1-1 calls led Aspen Mountain to advise device owners to upgrade their operating systems or disable the feature. In Japan's Hida Mountains, emergency dispatchers reported 134 false emergency calls, more than 14% of the total emergency call volume, between December 16, 2022, and January 23, 2023, attributed to Crash Detection triggering while an iPhone 14 owner was skiing.

See also
 List of iOS and iPadOS devices
 History of the iPhone
 Comparison of smartphones
 Timeline of iPhone models

References

External links
  – official website

iOS

Mobile phones introduced in 2022
Mobile phones with 4K video recording
Mobile phones with multiple rear cameras
Flagship smartphones
Phablets
Foxconn